Edward C. Waymire is an American mathematician, and professor of mathematics at Oregon State University.  He was the chief editor of the Annals of Applied Probability between 2006 and 2008.   He is currently president of the Bernoulli Society for Mathematical Statistics and Probability. He is the recipient of the 2014 Carver Medal from the Institute of Mathematical Statistics.

Books
Bhattacharya, R., E. Waymire (2007): A Basic Course in Probability Theory, Universitext, Springer, NY.
Bhattacharya, R., E. Waymire (2009): Stochastic Processes with Applications, SIAM Classics in Applied Mathematics Series.

References

External links
 Edward C Waymire's homepage.

Oregon State University faculty
21st-century American mathematicians
Living people
Year of birth missing (living people)
Place of birth missing (living people)